"The Billionaire of Dismal Downs" is a 1993 Scrooge McDuck comic by Don Rosa. It is the ninth of the original 12 chapters in the series The Life and Times of Scrooge McDuck. The story takes place from 1898 to 1902.

The story was first published in the Danish Anders And & Co. #1993-45; the first American publication was in Uncle Scrooge #293, in August 1995.

Plot
Having struck it rich in the Klondike Gold Rush (see chapter 8, King of the Klondike), Scrooge goes home to Scotland. He tries to settle in Dismal Downs with his family, but after realizing that he doesn't fit in very well in Scotland any more, he hires Scottie McTerrier to look after the McDuck castle for him, while Scrooge and his sisters leave for a small, unseeming town called Duckburg located in Calisota, United States. Scrooge had recently bought a plot of land there from the founder's grandson while he was a sourdough in Alaska. The morning Scrooge and his sisters leave the McDuck castle, their father Fergus dies, joining his late wife and the rest of the Clan McDuck.

Notes
This is the first actual appearance of Scottie McTerrier, invented by Rosa's mentor Carl Barks. Barks had used the character in his story The Old Castle's Secret, but at the end, it became apparent that it was really a criminal impersonating Scottie and not Scottie himself, who had died months before the setting of the story.

External links

The Billionaire of Dismal Downs on Duckman
The Life and Times of $crooge McDuck - Episode 9

Fiction set in 1898
Fiction set in 1899
Fiction set in 1900
Fiction set in 1901
Fiction set in 1902
1993 in comics
Donald Duck comics by Don Rosa
Comics set in the 19th century
Comics set in the 1900s
Comics set in Scotland
Works set in castles
The Life and Times of Scrooge McDuck